The Capture of Las Tunas was a military engagement of the Cuban War of Independence. It took place from August 27 to 30, 1897 at Las Tunas, Oriente.

The Capture
In the final days of August 1897, the forces commanded by Lieutenant General Calixto García laid siege to the important military plaza of Victoria de Las Tunas which was almost uninhabited, since most of its inhabitants had gone to the jungle.

After three days of bloody combat, the Cuban forces managed to make the Spanish garrison surrender and capture the plaza, after which they set it on fire, but not before seizing important caches of weapons and ammunition, as well as food and medicine. The casualties of the battle consisted of 29 killed and 60 wounded for the Cubans and 161 killed, 176 wounded and 409 captured.

Aftermath
The Capture of Las Tunas represented a very important military victory for the Cuban Liberation Army, as well as a demoralizing defeat for the Spanish Army. At the media level, it served to discredit the propaganda campaign that Captain General Valeriano Weyler carried out about his supposed "pacification" of Cuba and the supposed "success" of his feared and despised Reconcentration of him. It represented one of the last Spanish military defeats, before the dismissal of Weyler as head of Cuba and the promulgation, in November of the same year, of the Autonomic Charter which sought to placate independence spirits by granting autonomy, something that didn't work either. Spain would end up losing Cuba, Puerto Rico, the Philippines and Guam in 1898 at the hands of the United States.

References

Further reading

1897 in Cuba
Conflicts in 1897
Battles involving Spain
Spanish colonial period of Cuba
August 1897 events
Battles involving Cuba